Graphic medicine connotes use of comics in medical education and patient care.

Overview
The phrase was coined by Ian Williams to denote "the intersection between the medium of comics and the discourse of healthcare". Comics offer an engaging, powerful, and accessible method of delivering illness narratives. The academic appraisal of graphic fiction is in its infancy, but its examination by academics involved in healthcare-related studies is increasing, with work emerging in journals such as Configurations: A Journal of Literature, Science, and Technology (2.2) as well as Journal of the Medical Humanities and Literature and Medicine. In 2020, Technical Communications Quarterly published a special issue on comics and graphic storytelling. This issue included a category of research articles examining graphic health communication.    

It is notable that the Medical Humanities movement in many medical schools advocates the framework and use of literature in exploring illness, from practitioner and patient perspectives. A recent  entry to the scholarly study of graphic medicine is the Einstein Foundation funded project at the Freie Universität Berlin (2016-2019) under the direction of Irmela Marei Krüger-Fürhoff and with the collaboration of Susan Merrill Squier, Einstein Visiting Fellow and Brill Professor at the Pennsylvania State University.  The PathoGraphics research group was concerned with the study of illness narratives or pathographies and works of graphic medicine. In 2020, the Graphic Medicine book series at Penn State University Press published PathoGraphics: Narrative, Aesthetics, Contention, Community, eds. Susan M. Squier and Irmela Marei Krüger-Fürhoff.    

Williams set up the Graphic Medicine website in 2007 while writing a masters dissertation on medical narrative in comics and graphic novels, during which time he found Susan M. Squier's essays,  “Beyond nescience: the intersectional insights of health humanities”, and “So Long as They Grow Out of It: Comics, The Discourse of Developmental Normalcy, and Disability". Scholars from around the world who were interested in comics and healthcare began to get in touch, notably Prof Michael Green, who had recently set up a graphic narratives course at Hershey Medical School at Penn State University, and MK Czerwiec, aka "Comic Nurse", who had, for many years, been recording her experiences as an HIV hospice nurse in comics form.   

Green invited his colleagues Kimberley Myers, of the Medical Humanities Program at Penn State Milton Hershey Medical School and Susan M. Squier, Brill Professor of English and Women's, Gender, and Sexuality Studies, who teaches graphic medicine to Ph.D. students at the Penn State University and whose work Williams had encountered earlier, to the discussion group, and Williams introduced Maria Vaccarella, Giskin Day and Columba Quigley. The group decided to hold a conference, in 2010 at The University of London, which led to a series of annual international conferences with presentations that are frequently posted as podcasts after the conference. 

Penn State University Press published The Graphic Medicine Manifesto in 2015. Authors are MK Czerwiec, Ian Williams, Susan Merrill Squier, Michael J. Green, Kimberly R. Myers, and Scott T. Smith.  Content summary: "Combining scholarly essays with visual narratives and a conclusion in comics form, establishes graphic medicine as a new area of scholarship.  Demonstrates that graphic medicine narratives offer patients, family members, and medical caregivers new ways to negotiate the challenges of the medical experience.  Discusses comics as visual rhetoric"—Provided by publisher.; 195 pages, includes bibliographic references.  This was the inaugural volume in the ongoing Graphic Medicine series at Penn State University Press, which is co-edited by Susan M. Squier and Ian Williams.

In 2014, the first American Library Association Will Eisner Graphic Novel Growth Grant was awarded to Ypsilanti District Library, (Ypsilanti, Michigan) for its proposal to build a collection of graphic medicine narratives. To date, that collection contains over 300 titles. Author MK Czerwiec lectured in the fall of 2014 at St. Joseph Mercy Hospital (Ypsilanti, Michigan) in support of this grant.

In 2018, the United States National Library of Medicine launched an exhibition,  Graphic Medicine: Ill-Conceived and Well Drawn!, and a video, A Conversation about Graphic Medicine.   The exhibition includes a special display, traveling banner exhibition, and online exhibition.

Graphic medicine’s popularity keeps growing across the world . In some clinical settings, graphic medicine is being used to explore therapeutic possibilities. Beyond the US and UK, graphic medicine is practiced and studied in Spain, Taiwan, Germany, India, Singapore, and a host of other nations. For example, Monica Lalanda's Medicina Grafica, the Japan Graphic Medicine Association (JGMA), Graphic Medicine Lab in India.

References

External links
 Annals Graphic Medicine by Annals of Internal Medicine
 Graphic Medicine
 Graphic Medicine annual conference
 Penn State Press Graphic Medicine book series
  - Graphic Medicine/Spain
    - Graphic Medicine/Japan
  - Graphic Medicine/India

Medical education
Diseases and disorders in comics
Medical humanities
Comics genres